The 1944 United States presidential election in Minnesota took place on November 7, 1944, as part of the 1944 United States presidential election. Voters chose 11 electors, or representatives to the Electoral College, who voted for president and vice president.

Minnesota was won by the Democratic candidate, incumbent President Franklin D. Roosevelt won the state over New York Governor Thomas E. Dewey by a margin of 62,448 votes, or 5.55%. Nationally, Roosevelt was re-elected to an unprecedented fourth term as president, with 432 electoral votes and a comfortable 7.5% lead over Dewey in the popular vote. However, Roosevelt would not serve the entirety of his fourth term, as he died within a half-year after winning his final election.

Roosevelt was the only president of the United States who was elected to more than two quadrennial terms. The 22nd Amendment, ratified on February 27, 1951, ensures that Roosevelt will continue to hold this record indefinitely, as the said amendment prohibits any person from serving more than two and a half terms as president.

Results

Results by county

See also
 United States presidential elections in Minnesota

References

1944
Min
1944 Minnesota elections